Ethinylestradiol sulfamate (developmental code name J1028), or 17α-ethynylestradiol 3-O-sulfamate, is a synthetic estrogen and estrogen ester which was never marketed. It is the C3 sulfamate ester of ethinylestradiol. The drug shows considerably improved oral estrogenic potency (uterotrophic) relative to ethinylestradiol in rats but without an increase in hepatic estrogenic potency. Related compounds like ethinylestradiol N,N-diethylsulfamate (J271) and ethinylestradiol pyrrolidinosulfonate (J272) have also been developed, and have similar properties in animals. However, the closely related compound estradiol sulfamate (E2MATE) failed to show estrogenic activity in humans, which is due to the fact that it is additionally a highly potent inhibitor of steroid sulfatase and prevents its own bioactivation into estradiol.

See also
 List of estrogen esters § Esters of other steroidal estrogens

References

Abandoned drugs
Ethynyl compounds
Tertiary alcohols
Estranes
Estrogen esters
Phenol esters
Prodrugs
Sulfamate esters
Synthetic estrogens